Mantet is a commune in the Pyrénées-Orientales department in southern France.

Geography 
Mantet is located in the canton of Le Canigou and in the arrondissement of Prades.

The village of Mantet lies at an altitude of 1550 metres about 200 metres below the Col de Mantet. The GR 10 Pyrenean footpath passes through the village so it is one of the few points in the Pyrenees Orientales where hikers can buy provisions and spend the night in comfort.

Population

See also
Communes of the Pyrénées-Orientales department

References

Communes of Pyrénées-Orientales